The Gene transfer format (GTF) is a file format used to hold information about gene structure.  It is a tab-delimited text format based on the general feature format (GFF), but contains some additional conventions specific to gene information.  A significant feature of the GTF that can be validated: given a sequence and a GTF file, one can check that the format is correct.  This significantly reduces problems with the interchange of data between groups.

GTF is identical to GFF, version 2.

References

External links
 Info from UCSC Genome Bioinformatics Site
 Detailed GTF v2.2 Format Description

Computer file formats
Bioinformatics